Agia Sofia is a neighbourhood that lies directly north of the centre of Patras, Greece. It takes its name from the Agia Sofia (Saint Sophia) church, which is the main church of the neighbourhood. The church is one of the largest in Patras and it is dedicated to the 6th-century Christian martyr Saint Sophia.

It is one of the most densely populated areas of Patras. Because of the proximity of the district to the centre of the city, it is the place for many businesses and the usual choice of accommodation for the students of the University of Patras.
At the centre of the neighbourhood is Nikis Square, at the intersection of Agias Sofias Street and Konstantinoupoleos Street. Agia Sofia lies near the seaside. Several important roads, including Greek National Road 8 (Corinth - Patras), pass through Agia Sofia. The old metric railway that connects Patras and Rion passes through the western part (Panachaiki stadium train stop).

Main streets

Agias Sofias Street
Athinon Street
Ellinos Stratiotou Street
Iroon Polytechneiou Street
Konstantinoupoleos Street
Korinthou Street
Navmachias Ellis Street
Pente Pigadion Street 
Zakynthou Street 
Thessalonikis Street

Schools
26th Primary School (26o Demotiko) located in the heart of Agia Sofia with a rich history spanning over 80 years. During the German occupation, the school was used as the local Commandatur HQ and on the roof of the school the base of the turret of the machine gun is still present 
31st Primary School (31o Demotiko)
6th High School - (6o Gymnasio)

References

Neighborhoods in Patras